Eliane Ekra was Chief of the Ministry of Health and AIDS Control in the Republic of the Ivory Coast from 2013 to 2018.

Ekra is on the board of directors of the MTN Foundation. She was awarded the 2014 Harambee Spain Award for the Promotion and Equality of African Women.

References 

Ivorian activists
Living people
Ivorian women in business
Year of birth missing (living people)